Callipyrga turrita is a species of beetle in the family Cerambycidae, and the only species in the genus Callipyrga. It was described by Edward Newman in 1842 using a specimen obtained by Rupert Kirk at Woodside near Sydney. This species is endemic to coastal eastern Australia from Townsville in Queensland down to Glenmore in New South Wales. The adult beetles are attracted to light and have been collected on Geijera parviflora and Flindersia xanthoxyla.

References

Lamiini
Beetles described in 1842
Taxa named by Edward Newman
Beetles of Australia